Brdarići is a village in the municipalities of Pale, Republika Srpska and Pale-Prača, Bosnia and Herzegovina.

Demographics 
According to the 2013 census, its population was 20, all Bosniaks living in the Pale-Prača part thus none in the Republika Srpska part.

References

Populated places in Pale, Bosnia and Herzegovina
Populated places in Pale-Prača